Agh Otluq (also Romanized as Āgh Otlūq; also known as Āghotlāq and Āg Otlūq) is a village in Zangebar Rural District, in the Central District of Poldasht County, West Azerbaijan Province, Iran. At the 2006 census, its population was 344, in 72 families.

References 

Populated places in Poldasht County